The Miracles Doin' Mickey's Monkey is an album by The Miracles, released in 1963 by Tamla Records. It includes the group's Top 10 smash single "Mickey's Monkey", written and produced by Holland-Dozier-Holland, which was later recorded by several other artists. "Mickey's Monkey" popularized "The Monkey" as a novelty dance. Also included is another H-D-H dance-oriented single, "I Gotta Dance to Keep From Crying", a Billboard Top 40 hit. The album peaked at No. 113 on the Billboard 200.

Much of the rest of the album is made up of popular dance songs, including "The Twist", "Twist and Shout" and The Contours' Motown hit "Do You Love Me". Miracles member Bobby Rogers co-wrote a song, "Dancin' Holiday", for the album. Miracle Claudette Robinson takes the lead on the Miracles' remake of The Orlons' hit, "The Wah-Watusi".

The Miracles Doin' Mickey's Monkey was released on CD by Motown Records in 1986, in a two-for-one set with their Away We A Go-Go album, and again by itself in a 1992 release.

Cover art
The album cover art is by Stanley Mouse; it was the artist's first album assignment. Berry Gordy often chose not to use pictures of his performers on the album covers of Motown's early releases, in order that the label not be defined strictly as a "black" record company.

Track listing

Side one
"Mickey's Monkey" (Holland-Dozier-Holland) – 2:46
"Dance What You Wanna" (James Alexander, Sam Cooke, Clifton White) – 2:45
"The Wah-Watusi" (Dave Appell, Kal Mann) – 2:38
"The Twist" (Hank Ballard) – 2:29
"Dancin' Holiday" (Diane Rogers, Fred Smith, Zelda Samuels) – 2:14
"Land of a Thousand Dances" (Chris Kenner) – 2:26

Side two
"I Gotta Dance to Keep From Crying" (Holland-Dozier-Holland) – 2:39
"The Monkey Time" (Curtis Mayfield) – 2:51
"The Groovey Thing" (Smokey Robinson) – 2:43
"Twist and Shout" (Phil Medley, Bert Russell) – 2:03
"Do You Love Me" (Berry Gordy, Jr.) – 2:39

Personnel
The Miracles
Smokey Robinson - lead vocals
Claudette Rogers Robinson - lead vocals (on "The Wah-Watusi"), background vocals
Bobby Rogers - background vocals
Ronnie White - background vocals
 Pete Moore - background vocals
Marv Tarplin - guitar

Production
The Funk Brothers - instrumentation
Smokey Robinson - producer 
Brian Holland - producer
Lamont Dozier - producer

References

1963 albums
The Miracles albums
Tamla Records albums
Albums produced by Smokey Robinson
Albums produced by Brian Holland
Albums produced by Lamont Dozier
Albums recorded at Hitsville U.S.A.